The Wound of Separation is a 1959 Turkish romantic drama film directed by Metin Erksan. It stars Sadri Alisik, Mualla Kaynak, and Nese Yulaç.

References

External links
 
 

1959 films
Turkish romantic drama films
1959 romantic drama films
Films directed by Metin Erksan